Omer Dostaler (November 19, 1849 – December 3, 1925) was a farmer and political figure in Quebec. He represented Berthier in the Legislative Assembly of Quebec in 1890 as a Liberal.

He was born in Sainte-Geneviève-de-Berthier, Canada East, the son of Pierre-Eustache Dostaler and Geneviève Mousseau, who was the daughter of Alexis Mousseau. Dostaler was educated in Berthierville. He operated the family farm, which he inherited on his father's death in 1884. In 1877, he married Sophie-Marie Desrosiers. He was elected to the Quebec assembly in an 1890 by-election held after Louis Sylvestre was named to the Quebec legislative council; Dostaler did not run for reelection in the 1890 general election. He died in Sainte-Geneviève-de-Berthier at the age of 77.

His cousins Joseph-Alfred Mousseau and Joseph-Octave Mousseau both served in the Canadian House of Commons.

References 
 

1849 births
1925 deaths
Quebec Liberal Party MNAs